Wolf in the Shadows is a 1993 book written by Marcia Muller and published by Mysterious Press The book that won the Anthony Award for Best Novel in 1994.

References 

Anthony Award-winning works
American mystery novels
1993 American novels
Mysterious Press books